Long Island National Wildlife Refuge Complex is a National Wildlife Refuge complex in the state of New York.  All of the component refuges are located on Long Island.

The Long Island National Wildlife Refuge Complex consists of seven national wildlife refuges, two refuge sub-units and one wildlife management area, all managed by the U.S. Fish and Wildlife Service. Each unit is unique and provides wildlife habitat amongst Long Island's urban settings essential for the livelihood of migratory birds, threatened and endangered species, fish and other wildlife. The strategic location of Long Island in the Long Island Pine Barrens and along the Atlantic Flyway make it an important nesting, wintering and migratory stop over area for hundreds of species of birds.

Refuges within the complex
 Amagansett National Wildlife Refuge
 Conscience Point National Wildlife Refuge
 Elizabeth A. Morton National Wildlife Refuge
 Lido Beach Wildlife Management Area
 Oyster Bay National Wildlife Refuge
 Sayville National Wildlife Refuge
 Seatuck National Wildlife Refuge
 Target Rock National Wildlife Refuge
 Wertheim National Wildlife Refuge

References

External links

U.S. Fish and Wildlife Service: Long Island National Wildlife Refuge Complex

National Wildlife Refuges in New York (state)